is a Japanese actress and singer. She won the award for best newcomer at the 6th Yokohama Film Festival for The Crazy Family. She also won the awards for best actress at the 16th Hochi Film Award and at the 1992 Blue Ribbon Award for War and Youth. Additionally, Kudoh has been nominated three times for Best Actress, in the 5th independent Spirit Award for Mystery Train, in the 15th Japanese Academy Prize for War and Youth, and in the 4th Golden Satellite Award for Snow Falling on Cedars.

Filmography

Films

Television

Stage productions
 Kiki's Delivery Service (as Kiki, 1993)

References

External links

Youki Kudoh's homepage 

TIME Asia – Young Japan: Who Killed Our Culture? We Did by Youki Kudoh

1971 births
21st-century Japanese actresses
21st-century Japanese singers
21st-century Japanese women singers
Actresses from Tokyo
Japanese female idols
Japanese women pop singers
Japanese women singers
Japanese film actresses
Japanese stage actresses
Japanese television actresses
Horikoshi High School alumni
Living people
Musicians from Hachiōji, Tokyo
Singers from Tokyo